George Frank Hurley (January 5, 1909 – April 9, 1995) was an American football offensive lineman in the National Football League for the Boston Braves/Redskins.  He played college football at Washington State University. He coached high school football at Cubberley High School in Palo Alto, California.

1909 births
1995 deaths
Players of American football from San Francisco
American football offensive guards
Boston Braves (NFL) players
Boston Redskins players
Washington State Cougars football players